The Young Mr. Pitt is a 1942 British biographical film of the life of William Pitt the Younger and in particular his struggle against revolutionary France and Napoleon. It was directed by Carol Reed and stars Robert Donat, Robert Morley, Phyllis Calvert and John Mills. Made in black-and-white, it was produced by Edward Black and Maurice Ostrer for the British subsidiary of 20th Century Fox.

It was filmed as the Second World War was raging. Similar parallels with the struggle against Hitler's Germany were implied in That Hamilton Woman (aka Lady Hamilton, 1941), made by Alexander Korda in the United States with Laurence Olivier and Vivien Leigh in the leads. Several of the speeches which Pitt makes against Napoleon are actually the words of Churchill in relation to Hitler, in particular the "we stand alone" speech from 1940.

Plot
In 1770, William Pitt the Elder gives a speech in Parliament strongly advising against war with the American colonies, and then advises his second son, a young man also named William Pitt, to avoid seeking fame through war. Years later, the ministry of Charles James Fox and Lord North falls. Pitt the Younger is only 24, unpopular due to his opposition to the war in America and with a reputation as a reformer, and with no majority in the House of Commons. However, despite all this, King George III summons him and asks him to form a government.

Pitt tries to gain Fox's support, but is rebuffed. He is ridiculed in Parliament, but despite having no majority, refuses to resign. He is even subject to a night ambush, but noted boxers Dan Mendoza and Gentleman Jackson help drive the assailants away. Reassured by the boxers' claims of strong support for him amongst the general public, Pitt calls an election on a platform of peace and prosperity, which gives him a majority. Against Fox's constant opposition, he then institutes reforms and strengthens the Royal Navy, whilst intermittently events in Napoleon Bonaparte's childhood and military training are shown.

The French Revolution erupts and France invades Belgium. With France and Britain both nominally committed to Dutch neutrality, Talleyrand fails to convince Pitt into an alliance with France or at least pro-French neutrality and a French invasion of the Dutch Republic soon afterwards triggers a British declaration of war. Public opinion turns against the war as early successes turn to defeats such as the Siege of Toulon, won by Napoleon's artillery knowledge, but even when Britain's continental allies fall Pitt refuses to sue for peace.

Pitt's friend William Wilberforce continues to support peace negotiations and abstains from a vote on the matter. Via an American intermediary Melvill, Talleyrand sends word to Pitt that French moderates are willing to make peace, but before Pitt can exploit this Napoleon seizes power in France. Learning of this during one of his regular visits to Walmer Castle, Pitt realises Napoleon's desire for world domination and commits himself totally to the arduous struggle ahead, sacrificing even his hopes for marriage to Eleanor Eden. He also discovers that he has neglected his personal finances and is now deeply in debt, though these debts are soon paid off by an unknown friend.

He institutes a bold but risky strategy, going on the offensive in the Mediterranean, and chooses Horatio Nelson over more senior admirals to lead the naval squadron assigned the task. Napoleon sails from Toulon to invade Egypt while Nelson's blockading ships are scattered by a gale. Meanwhile, Pitt collapses from overwork and is warned by his doctor about his health. Nelson finds and destroys the French fleet at the Battle of the Nile. The people cheer Pitt, but the war continues until Napoleon personally writes to George III, superficially to suggest peace negotiations but in fact to exacerbate pro- and anti-war divisions in Britain. Pitt is forced to resign, just before receiving news of Eleanor's impending wedding. A peace treaty is signed, giving Napoleon time to build up his armies and his fleet, whilst Addington's administration naively hopes for a lasting peace and neglects Britain's defences.

Napoleon gathers his forces on the French coast facing England and popular opinion thrusts Pitt into replacing Addington, despite his doctor's warnings. He gains the support of the king and even of Fox as he rearms Britain and institutes a system of fencibles and militia for home defence. The decisive British victory at the Battle of Trafalgar puts an end to the invasion threat, though in a speech at the Guildhall Pitt states that victory has been achieved not just by him but the whole nation, also predicting that Britain will go on to save Europe.

Cast

Production
Sidney Gilliat says he had a big fight with Carol Reed during the making of the film which resulted in Gilliant leaving the project.

Reception
Bosley Crowther of The New York Times felt "the nature of the historical period in which this film is set and the evident fidelity of the authors to the facts of Mr. Pitt's life conspire to prevent this picture from having a sharp dramatic impact."

According to Kinematograph Weekly the film was one of the most popular at the British box office in 1942, after Mrs Miniver, First of the Few, How Green Was My Valley, Reap the Wild Wind, Holiday Inn, Captains of the Clouds, Sergeant York, One of Our Aircraft is Missing and Hatter's Castle.

Notes

References

External links
 
 
 
 

1942 films
1940s biographical drama films
1940s historical drama films
British black-and-white films
British biographical drama films
British historical drama films
Compositions by Charles Williams
1940s English-language films
Films about prime ministers of the United Kingdom
Films directed by Carol Reed
Films set in 1770
Films set in the 1780s
Films set in the 1790s
Films set in the 1800s
Films set in England
Films set in London
French Revolutionary Wars films
Napoleonic Wars films
Films with screenplays by Frank Launder and Sidney Gilliat
Cultural depictions of Horatio Nelson
Cultural depictions of Charles Maurice de Talleyrand-Périgord
Depictions of Napoleon on film
Cultural depictions of William Pitt the Younger
20th Century Fox films
1940s British films